New York State is a major center for all types of music. New York has been a famous melting pot of cultures from around the world. Its diverse community has contributed to introducing and spreading many genres of music, including Salsa, Jazz, Folk, Rock and Roll, and Classical. New York's plethora of music venues and event halls serve as popular markers which have housed many noteworthy artists. 

New York is part of the United States, and its largest city, New York City, is regarded as one of the major centers for music in the world.

The music of New York City includes a wide variety of hip-hop, soul, salsa, rock and roll, punk, metal, electronic music, pop music, Disco and Funk and crosses all (five) borough lines. Jazz in the city is in more-isolated spots in the boroughs outside Manhattan, but is mainly concentrated in the legendary Greenwich Village mecca.

The rest of the state includes cities like Albany and Buffalo, which have their own scenes in a variety of genres. Nyack, Poughkeepsie and Long Island all have strong alternative music scenes as well.

The state is also home to many classical symphonies, folk groups and religious choirs.

Music venues
New York is full of music halls and venues that range in size and capacity as well as the genre it is known for. One of the most famous music halls in New York is the Apollo Theatre in the heart of Harlem. In 1913 the Apollo was built by Jules Hurtig and Harry Seamon, who originally used the theatre to host burlesque shows for the public. The Apollo would host the performances of acts that we know today as legends in their respective industries including but not limited to Ella Fitzgerald, James Brown, Miles Davis, Smokey Robinson, Jimi Hendrix, B.B. King, Diana Ross, James Brown, and Prince.

As the Great Depression hit in 1929, John Rockefeller was the owner of a strip in Manhattan worth ninety-one million dollars. He decided that he wanted to build upon the land he owned and eventually came to construct Rockefeller Center, including the Radio City Music Hall. Opening under the title of an Opera House, Radio City Music Hall was a beautiful sight that even the general public was given an opportunity to enjoy due to the tickets being relatively cheap in comparison to other venues at the time in Manhattan.

Carnegie Hall was built in 1890 by a philanthropist by the name of Andrew Carnegie on Seventh Ave between West 56th Street and West 57th Street in the heart of Manhattan. The five-level music hall is well known for its Classical sound and has a plethora of notable performers such as B.B King, The Beatles, The New York Philharmonic, Duke Ellington, Billie Holiday, Tina Turner, and The Rolling Stones just to name a few.

While these are many of the more significant music venues in the State of New York, there are many other venues. These include but are not limited to:

New York State
 Bethel Woods Center
 Blue Cross Arena
 The Bowery Ballroom
 Eastman Theatre
 The Egg
 Hubbard Hall
 Java Barn
 Jones Beach Theater
 Keybank Center
 Palace Theater
 Shea’s Theater

New York City 
Throughout the rest of New York State there are even more music halls in New York City including: 
 Bargemusic
 Birdland
 The Bitter End
 Bowery Ballroom
 Brooklyn Academy of Music
 Brooklyn Bowl
 Brooklyn Steel
 Death By Audio
 Ford Amphitheater at Coney Island
 Madison Square Garden
 Manhattan Center
 Mercury Lounge
 Michael Schimmel Center for the Arts
 Miller Theatre
 Minton's Playhouse
 Music Hall of Williamsburg
 Onyx Club
 Paradise Theater
 Pianos
 PlayStation Theater
 Rockwood Music Hall
 Roseland Ballroom
 Savoy Ballroom
 The Sound Factory Bar
 St. George Theatre
 Terminal 5

Festivals and events 
New York has become a destination for music lovers as it hosts a wide variety of music festivals each year.New York is also called as 'Origin of Music'.It is the best place for musician for learning. New York Philharmonic organizes the Free Memorial Day concert at Cathedral of St. John the Divine on Memorial Day. The cathedral also offers the show named Great Music in a Great Space (GMGS). GMGS consists of three concert series: The Great Choir choral series, The Great Organ recital series, and Holiday concerts. Other than that, The Apollo Theater, Lincoln Center, The Blue Note Jazz Club, and New York's floating concert hall Bargemusic compose occasions consistently.

Eastman School of Music in Rochester presents shows by the prestigious Rochester Philharmonic and acclaimed artists in each melodic style. Since 2002, Xerox organizes the Rochester International Jazz Festival in June at multiple venues throughout the downtown Rochester. Chautauqua Institution offers numerous summer concerts in a pure lakeside setting, via its Symphony Orchestra, Opera Company, Chamber Music series, Glimmerglass Festivaland recitals by exceptional 17 to 25 year old musicians studying at the annual Music Festival.

The Glimmerglass Festival, which is formerly known as Glimmerglass Opera, organizes exciting presentation every year in Cooperstown. Hunter Mountain has facilitated numerous summer music festival for a long time, including Mountain Jam, Taste of Country Music Festival, German Alps Festival, and the International Celtic Festival.

Belleayre Music Festival likewise offers summer concerts in all styles of music, including a Catskill Mountain Jazz Series in August. Music festivals like Brantling Bluegrass Festival, Grey Fox Bluegrass Festival, Syracuse Jazz Festival, or Clearwater's Great Hudson River Revival are some other festivals worth going to.

Genres

Indigenous music

The varied history of New York’s music genres begins with the music of the Haudenosaunee Confederation, also known as the Iroquois. They inhabited large part of New York State before some groups (especially the Seneca and Mohawk) being displaced by various circumstances to places such as Wisconsin, Oklahoma and Ontario, Canada.

Salsa 
This popular dance music came about during the early 1960s in New York City. The first salsa bands originally consisted of Puerto Rican and Cuban immigrants who arrived in the early 1920s. This well known Latin fusion arose through the hybridization of rhythms deriving from areas such as Puerto Rico and Cuba. Salsa began as an informal product of various preexisting popular Latin American styles of music such as son montuno, guaracha, cha chá, mambo, and to a certain extent bolero, and the Puerto Rican bomba and plena. Famous American percussionist and bandleader Tito Puente is credited for taking this newfound Afro-Cuban mix and developing it into a more defined genre. Other popular American Salsa singers from New York who popularized the genre were Mario Bauza, Mongo Santamaria and Perez Prado. Growth persisted in the genre due to its close relationship with another well known New York genre referred to as Latin jazz. This Afro-Cuban rhythmic form later branched out from New York to various Latin American countries to form regional variants.

Folk 
In terms of music and culture, New York has always been diverse. After the Great Depression and Dustbowl, Folk became a pillar of the New York music scene and it quickly found a home base in Greenwich Village—a neighborhood that was the center of artistic innovation of all kinds. Israel G Young is also known as Izzy, a famous dancer in Greenwich village, opened the store Folklore Center which became a central place for all folkies . A few artists from the area went mainstream including Pete Seeger, Joan Baez, and Bob Dylan. Another center for urban folk was The Washington Square Park. On Sunday afternoon, all the folk musician including John Cohen, Mike Seeger, Barry Kornfeld, Eric Weissberg, Dave Van Ronk, Happy Traum, Jack Elliott, Tom Paley, Dick Rosmini, and Marshall Brickman used to flock to the place and sing for the rest of the day. Some of the famous folk groups are:
 The New Lost City Ramblers
 Kingston Trio
 Peter Paul & Mary
 The Weavers
 The Tarriers
 The Journeymen
 The Rooftop Singers

Blues and jazz 
Blues music came to New York in the early 1900s as a slower and rather sad form of music. The term blues comes from the phrase “I'm feeling blue,” as in sad or down in one way or another. Blues Came to New York and very quickly gained a feeling of Jazz and became a form of music that is a tad uptempo in comparison to its slow rural relative. New York Blues was primarily formed by Jesse Stone as well as Mabel Louis Smith who both stem from the southern to middle America where country blues originated. While most original blues songs were about God and faith, as time went on the music began to adapt to the joys and sorrows of rural life in the south until it was brought up north to New York.

Jazz has provided some of the most influential histories in New York within communities. The African American community has benefited greatly from the music genre especially with the exploration of the Cotton Club. The Cotton Club opened its doors in 1923 by Owen Madden as a white audience who were to be entertained by African American Performers. These performers may include Duke Ellington, Bill Robinson, Lena Horne, and Adelaide Hall where all of their careers received their humble beginnings. All these Jazz performers were given radio play through Columbia Records thus providing each artist with exposure. While Jazz was growing in popularity, prohibition had been in effect making alcohol illegal which led to the opening of Speakeasies around the City. These played a massive part in the Jazz culture because they would host large crowds at a secret location where people could drink and enjoy a performance from an upcoming artist like Duke Ellington in the Early 20s.

Jazz was just as much a fashion movement as it was a musical movement. The Jazz era in America led to women wearing more revealing clothing, cutting their hair, and becoming more promiscuous. These women, referred to as flappers, were just as much about adding purpose and changing the female mindset as they were about their fashion. Women were no longer submissive and were taking their path to having fun and altered a number of rules that had been set in the past for women.

Classical 
New York contains a rich history in terms of the classical culture. This age of classical development began in the early 1830s. This classical age consisted of European classical music. During this rise of many troupes formed in order to support both the arts as well as American nationalism. Some of these entities such as the New York Philharmonic persisted into the recent history. During the early 1900s central hubs for formal performances began to arise such as the Metropolitan Opera House in 1882 and Carnegie Hall in 1891. American Composers such as George Frederick Bristow aided in the popularization of the Philharmonic. Edward MacDowell was another iconic classical composer in the early 1900s who began melding genres of folk which deviated from European classical. The most influential New York composer of the early twentieth century was George Gershwin for his influence on the growing film industry. His stylistic nuances ranging from Jazz to symphony paved a path to the popularization of musical theater and Broadway.

Hip-hop 

The South Bronx has been the center for struggle for a long time. After World War I the Jewish population of New York moved south to Manhattan or north to upstate New York. This is more commonly known as the "White Flight". The South Bronx became quickly filled with gang activity and landlord abandonment. In 1970, Dj's changed the game with looping the breakbeat. DJ Kool Herc, a Jamaican immigrant is often regarded as the father of hip-hop music. After the major break through, hip hop exceeded past New York State and reached the west coast. Towards the mid 1980s hip-hop started to focus more on the rappers instead of dancing. Artists such as Biggie Smalls started getting national recognition for their lyrical ability.  These rappers would write songs about their toxic environment and created a whole subgenre of Hip-Hop called "Gangster Rap". Golden age hip hop is considered to be around the time period of 1980s and early 1990s. The 80's and 90's were dubbed the Golden Age due to new types of sub-genres of rap were emerging every day.

See also 
Music of New York City

References